The Peter Gorman Trophy is awarded to the Rookie of the Year in U Sports Football. The Trophy acknowledges the great contribution Peter Gorman has made to the development of Canadian University Football. As founder of the Canadian College Bowl, his emphasis has always been on the youth of Canada, and is therefore associated with the award to encourage U Sports rookies.

List of Peter Gorman winners

See also
Hec Crighton Trophy
J. P. Metras Trophy
Presidents' Trophy
Russ Jackson Award

References

U Sports football trophies and awards